The 1963–64 Nationalliga A season was the 26th season of the Nationalliga A, the top level of ice hockey in Switzerland. 10 teams participated in the league, and HC Villars won the championship.

Standings

External links
 Championnat de Suisse 1963/64

Swiss
National League (ice hockey) seasons
1963–64 in Swiss ice hockey